Star One was an Indian pay television network based in Mumbai. In November 2006, Star One was launched in the UK on Sky.

Star One was rebranded as Life OK on 18 December 2011. Its British feed continued broadcasting in the UK and Ireland until 28 May 2012, when it was also rebranded as Star Life OK.

Programming
This is the list of original programming formerly broadcast by Star One

Anthology series
Studio One (2004–2005)

Children's series

Aflatoons (2005–2007)
A.T.O.M (2006–2009)
Braceface (2005–2007)
Gargoyles (2005–2006)
Power Rangers Dino Thunder (2006–2007)
Power Rangers Lightspeed Rescue (2008–2009) 
Power Rangers Ninja Storm (2008)
Power Rangers Wild Force (2007–2008)
Spider-Man (2005–2006)
Spider-Man and His Amazing Friends (2008)
The New Adventures of Lucky Luke (2005–2008)
Super Robot Monkey Team Hyperforce Go! (2005–2006)
Teenage Mutant Ninja Turtles (2009)
W.I.T.C.H. (2007–2008)
The World of Tosh(2006–2007)

Comedy series

Annu Ki Ho Gayee Wah Bhai Wah (2007–2008)
Funjabbi Chak De (2007–2008)
The Great Indian Comedy Show (2004–2007)
HA HA HA (2007)
Happy Go Lucky (2005)
Hey...Yehii To Haii Woh! (2004–2005)
Hum Dono Hain Alag Alag (2009)
Instant Khichdi (2005)
Kadvee Khattee Meethi (2006–2007)
Naya Office Office (2007)
Paani Puri (2008–2009)
Sarabhai vs Sarabhai (2004–2006)

Drama series

Betiyaan Apni Yaa Paraaya Dhan (2007)
Chhoona Hai Aasmaan (2007–2008)
Dhoondh Legi Manzil Humein (2010–2011) 
Dil Kya Chahta Hai (2004–2005)
Dill Mill Gayye(2007–2010) 
Detective Omkar Nath (D.O.N.) (2006)
Family Business (2004–2005)
Geet Hui Sabse Parayi (2010–2011)
Guns & Roses (2004–2005)
Hotel Kingston (2005)
India Calling (2005–2006)
Jaane Pehchaane Se... Ye Ajnabbi (2009–2010)
Love Ne Mila Di Jodi (2009–2010)
Miley Jab Hum Tum (2008–2010) 
Pari Hoon Main (2008)
Pyar Ki Kashti Mein (2004)
Rang Badalti Odhani (2010–2011)
Remix (2004–2006)
Resham Dankh (2006)
Saathii Re (2006–2007)
Siddhant (2005–2006)
Special Squad (2004–2005)
Viraasat (2007)
Yeh Dil Chahe More (2005–2006) 
Yeh Ishq Haaye (2010–2011)
Yeh Tera Ghar Yeh Mera Ghar (2011)

Horror/supernatural series

Ghost Bana Dost (2006–2007)
Horror Nights (2005)
Mano Ya Na Mano (2006–2010)
Pyaar Kii Ye Ek Kahaani (2010–2011)
Shakuntala (2009)
Ssshhhh...Phir Koi Hai (2006–2010)

Reality/non-scripted programming

Antakshari – The Great Challenge (2005)
Apni Tuning Jamegi (2006)
Bingo Aur Suresh Menon (2008)
Bluff Master (2004–2005)
Body & Soul (2004–2005)
Bol Baby Bol (2007–2008)
Cook Na Kaho (2005)
Ek Se Badhkar Ek (2006–2007)
Exotica (2004–2005)
Games Bond(2005)
The Great Indian Laughter Challenge (2005–2008)
Hans Baliye (2009)
Har Ghar Kuch Kehta Hai(2004–2005) 
Heartbeat (2006)
Hello Kaun? Pehchaan Kaun (2008–2009)
He Man (2004–2005)
Home Shanti Home (2004–2006)
India's Magic Star (2010)
Jet Set Go (2006)
Kisko Milega Cash (2008)
Koffee with Karan (2005–2007)
Lakme Fashion House (2004–2005)
Laughter Ke Phatke (2009) 
Laughter Knights (2008–2009)
Lead India(2007–2008) 
Men Mange More (2004–2005)
Nach Baliye (2005–2006)
Ranvir Vinay Aur Kaun? (2007)
Super Sale (2005)
Zara Nachke Dikha (2008)

Reruns of Star Plus series

Hatim (2008)
Kaun Banega Crorepati (2006)Mind Games - Baazi Dimag Ki (2009–2010)Mum Tum Aur Hum (2008)Shaka Laka Boom Boom (2008)Shararat – Thoda Jaadu, Thodi Nazaakat (2008)Shanno Ki Shaadi (2009)Son Pari (2008)Tere Mere Beach Mein (2009–2010)Vikraal Aur Gabraal (2008)

Star One UKHot Seat'' (2009–2010)

References

External links
Star One programming on Star Player (online portal)
indya.com - STAR - STAR One (Wayback)
indya.com - STAR - STAR One (Wayback)

Television stations in Mumbai
Television channels and stations established in 2004
Television channels and stations disestablished in 2011
Hindi-language television stations
Defunct television channels in India
Disney Star